Petr Kocek (born 26 May 1952) is a Czech former cyclist. He competed at the 1976 Summer Olympics and the 1980 Summer Olympics.

References

External links
 

1952 births
Living people
Czech male cyclists
Olympic cyclists of Czechoslovakia
Cyclists at the 1976 Summer Olympics
Cyclists at the 1980 Summer Olympics
People from Nový Bor
Sportspeople from the Liberec Region